The traceability of genetically modified organisms (GMOs) describes a system that ensures the forwarding of the identity of a GMO from its production to its final buyer. Traceability is an essential prerequisite for the co-existence of GM and non-GM foods, and for the freedom of choice for consumers.

Why traceability is needed
The traceability of GMOs is founded on two needs. First, consumers in many countries are reluctant to buy genetically modified foods, and are skeptical of the use of GM crops for animal feed. Consequently, the concept of co-existence has been developed to separate GM and non-GM supply chains, and is only possible if all purchasers along the production chain know what they are buying. Secondly, although every GMO that is approved for commercialisation must have passed a safety assessment, it may be necessary to withdraw a certain GMO from the market - for example, if new scientific evidence raises doubts about its safety.

Unique identifiers for GMOs
For these purposes, after three years of debate, the OECD countries came up with an identity code for GMOs in 2002. Initially, some member countries (for example, the US, but also Canada and Australia) were opposed to the concept. The final decision requires the assignment of a "unique identifier" to each GMO event which is authorised in one or more OECD countries. The unique identifier is a code consisting of nine letters and/or numbers. The first two or three characters indicate the company submitting the application, while the following six or five characters specify the respective transformation event. The last digit serves as a verifier. All the crop varieties derived from one transformation event will share the same unique identifier.

The unique identifier has been integrated in the Cartagena Protocol on Biosafety and in the European Union legislation on the labelling and traceability of genetically modified organisms (Regulation (EC) No 1830/2003). Detailing the unique identifier, the regulation demands the forwarding of written documentation of the identity of a GMO at every stage of the production process. This allows a GMO to be traced even if, for example, due to intensive processing, it can no longer be detected. Using this unique identifier, information on all approved transgenic GMOs is accessible through the Biosafety Clearing-House, the information exchange platform of the Cartagena Protocol.

Detection methods supplement documentation
Traceability does not rely solely on documentation. By biochemical means (polymerase chain reaction) even tiny traces of GMOs can be detected and identified—provided that suitable testing tools exist for the GMO assumed to be present. In the EU, such a tool must be part of the application documents for the approval for commercialisation. For most products and production stages, testing methods are available to monitor and enforce the compliance with traceability regulations.

See also
Detection of genetically modified organisms

External links
  Biosafety Clearing House database of unique identifiers
 Regulation (EC) No 1830/2003 of the European Parliament and of the Council of 22 September 2003 concerning the traceability and labeling of genetically modified organisms and the traceability of food and feed products produced from genetically modified organisms
 Co-Extra - EU research programme on co-existence and traceability of GMOs 
GMO Safety: Environmental traceability of genetically modified rape cultivars Research project funded by the Bavarian State Ministry of the Environment
USDA Bets the Farm on Animal ID Program

Food safety
Genetically modified organisms in agriculture